The women's individual recurve competition at the 2013 World Archery Championships took place on 29 September – 6 October 2013 in Belek, Turkey.

115 archers from 49 countries entered the competition, with a maximum of three entries per country. The top 104 archers qualified for the knockout tournament, with the top 8 scores in qualifying receiving a bye to the third round. The reigning champion, Denisse van Lamoen of Chile, did not defend her title as she was momentarily retired from the international scene.

Schedule
All times are local (UTC+02:00).

Qualification round
Pre-tournament world rankings ('WR') are taken from the 28 August 2013 World Archery Rankings. Qualification consisted of 4 rounds of 36 arrows, at 70m, 60m, 50m, and 30m.

 Bye to third round 
 Qualified for eliminations

Elimination rounds

Top half

Section 1

Section 2

Section 3

Section 4

Bottom half

Section 5

Section 6

Section 7

Section 8

Finals

References

2013 World Archery Championships
World